Kindergarten Cop 2 is a 2016 American comedy film starring Dolph Lundgren and directed by Don Michael Paul. It is a standalone sequel to the 1990 film Kindergarten Cop, starring Arnold Schwarzenegger. Principal photography in Maple Ridge, Langley, and Vancouver, British Columbia, Canada took place for 28 days, from July 27 to August 24, 2015. The school at which the film was produced is Kanaka Elementary. The film was released by Universal Pictures Home Entertainment on DVD in the United States on May 17, 2016.

Plot

Federal agent Zack Reed and his partner Sanders are pursuing dangerous criminal leader Alexander Zogu who has discovered a copy of the FBI witness protection database. The file has been stored on a USB flash drive by a now-deceased kindergarten teacher. 

After Sanders interviews the teacher's students and the staff, no one seems to know where the drive is. So Reed, with a fictitious resumé, applies for the role of teacher to the bereaved class and is easily hired.

The school has a very liberal/modern perspective on teaching and managing children which is, at first, quite awkward to Reed's more straightforward ways. On his first day, Reed struggles to keep the kids' attention and to keep it together. One boy has severe allergies, especially nuts, so mayhem breaks out when they realize that Reed is eating peanut butter. Again he loses control when he gives them chocolate cookies and they bounce off the walls from the sugar.

Although day one is rough, Reed insists he will persevere without Sanders' help. He uses an air horn to command obedience, but the principal gives him one strike. This motivates Reed to apologize and ask for some assistance from Sanders (father of five), Reed learns to lead the class in a more relational and emotionally-aware way. 

Reed's co-teacher in kindergarten, Olivia is an attractive single woman. When she catches him in her office snooping for the thumb drive, Reed asks her out on a date and they begin to connect romantically.

Reed and Olivia's classes compete in a capture the flag competition and his class win for the first time. As his students explain that the other kids' are larger, he gives them a trojan horse strategy. 

The criminal leader, Zogu, captures the FBI surveillance van and discovers the crucial role of the children. In the meantime Reed reveals his cover to the principal, telling her about Zogu and the importance of locking down the school. 

Zogu finds the thumb drive with the children on a field trip, but they manage to surprise him with their trojan horse attack strategy. The drive is returned to the FBI and the kids celebrate their victory with their parents.

Cast

 Dolph Lundgren as FBI Agent Zack Reed
 Fiona Vroom as Michelle
 Aleks Paunovic as Alexander Zogu
 Andre Tricoteux as Valmir
 Bill Bellamy as Agent Sanders
 Sarah Strange as Miss Sinclaire
 Darla Taylor as Olivia
 Raphael Alejandro as Cowboy
 Enid-Raye Adams as Jett's Mom
 Jody Thompson as Hot Mom
 Rebecca Olson as Katja
 Dean Petriw as Jett
 Jenny Sandersson as Hot Mom
 Carolyn Adair as Felicity
 Nicholas Carella as Bernie the Hot Single Dad
 Michael P. Northey as Hal Pasquale
 Josiah Black as Jason Flaherty
 James Ralph as SWAT Leader
 Abbie Magnuson as Molly
 Tyreah Herbert as Hannah
 Blake Stadel as Mr. Edwards (Molly's Dad)
 Oscar Hartley as Simon
 Matilda Shoichet-Stoll as Sophie
 Valencia Budijanto as Patience
 William Budijanto as Tripp
 Chris Violette as Country Bar Bartender (uncredited)
 Tawny West as Line Dancer (uncredited)

Production
On June 1, 2015, it was reported that The Garden and Half Past Dead filmmaker Don Michael Paul would be directing the film, and Arnold Schwarzenegger would not be reprising his role as Detective John Kimble. Schwarzenegger announced that his character Detective John Kimble is now officially retired from being a kindergarten teacher and police officer.

Schwarzenegger was replaced by Dolph Lundgren as a new character, FBI Agent Zack Reed. On December 21, 2015, the 25th anniversary of the theatrical release of the original film, the first official photos of Kindergarten Cop 2 were released via About.

Reception

Common Sense Media gave the film a score of 2 out of 5, and described it as "FBI man meets cute kids in trite comedy; violence, profanity."
Randall Colburn of Consequence of Sound gave it a grade D+ and wrote: "Kindergarten Cop 2 ultimately resonates as nothing more than a sub-par rendition of its predecessor. The script is bad, the direction is uninspired, the villain is boring, and Lundgren can't navigate that space between comedy and action like Arnie can."

References

External links
 
 Kindergarten Cop 2 at Universal Pictures Home Entertainment

2016 films
2016 direct-to-video films
2016 comedy films
2010s buddy comedy films
2010s buddy cop films
2010s police comedy films
2010s police procedural films
American buddy cop films
American buddy comedy films
American police detective films
American sequel films
Direct-to-video comedy films
Direct-to-video sequel films
Films about educators
Films about the Federal Bureau of Investigation
Films about witness protection
Films directed by Don Michael Paul
Films scored by Jake Monaco
Films set in British Columbia
Films shot in Vancouver
Imagine Entertainment films
Universal Pictures direct-to-video films
2010s English-language films
2010s American films